Cyrtodactylus taybacensis, also known as the Taybac bent-toed gecko, is a species of gecko endemic to Vietnam.

References

Cyrtodactylus
Reptiles described in 2019
Reptiles of Vietnam
Endemic fauna of Vietnam